Buck Privates is a 1928 American silent comedy film directed by Melville W. Brown and starring Lya De Putti,  Malcolm McGregor and Zasu Pitts.

Two American soldiers serving as part of the Allied Occupation Forces in Germany after World War I fall in love with the daughter of the local mayor and engage in a series of battles to win her heart.

Cast
 Lya De Putti as Annie  
 Malcolm McGregor as John Smith  
 Zasu Pitts as Hulda  
 James A. Marcus as Maj. Hartman  
 Eddie Gribbon as Sgt. Butts  
 Taylor N. Duncan as Capt. Marshall  
 Bud Jamison as Cupid Dodds  
 Les Bates as Mose Bloom

References

Bibliography
 Munden, Kenneth White. The American Film Institute Catalog of Motion Pictures Produced in the United States, Part 1. University of California Press, 1997.

External links

1928 films
1928 comedy films
Silent American comedy films
Films directed by Melville W. Brown
American silent feature films
1920s English-language films
Universal Pictures films
American black-and-white films
1920s American films